Soul Assassins is a hardcore hip hop project of Cypress Hill member and producer DJ Muggs. Each album features a plethora of guest rappers and is primarily produced by Muggs; the second and third studio albums see contributions from other producers such as The Alchemist and DJ Khalil.

Soul Assassins is also a marketing brand, with visuals created by chicano artists and friends Estevan Oriol (analogue street photographer) and Mister Cartoon (street artist and tattooer).

Discography

Albums
 1997:  Soul Assassins: Chapter I
 2000: Soul Assassins II
 2009: Soul Assassins: Intermission
 2018: Soul Assassins: Día Del Asesinato

Singles
 1997: Dr. Dre & B-Real - Puppet Master
 2009: Sick Jacken & Evidence - Classical
 2009: Bun B, M-1 - Gangsta Shit

Mixtapes
 2002: Soul Assassins Mixtape Vol. One

References

External links
 

American hip hop groups
Hip hop collectives